The 2003–04 Scottish Cup was the 119th staging of Scotland's most prestigious football knockout competition, also known for sponsorship reasons as the Tennent's Scottish Cup. The Cup was won by Celtic who defeated Dunfermline Athletic in the final. The final was Henrik Larsson's last competitive match for Celtic. The Final also proved to be Dunfermline manager Jimmy Calderwood's last match as manager of the Fife club.

First round

Replays

Second round

Replay

Third round

Replays

Fourth round

Quarter-finals

Replay

Semi-finals

Replay

Final

Scottish Cup seasons
Scottish Cup, 2003-04
Scot